Hedinia may refer to:
 Hedinia (stonefly), an insect genus in the family Perlodidae
 Hedinia (plant), a plant genus in the family Brassicaceae